The Interstate 435 Bridge is a girder bridge crossing of the Kansas River. It carries six lanes of Interstate 435, three south, three north. It also crosses the Union Pacific Railroad tracks at the north side, and the BNSF Railway at the south.

In 2019, the Missouri Department of Transportation announced a two-year rehabilitation project to make repairs on the bridge. The project is expected to cost $32 million.

References

Bridges over the Kansas River
Bridges in Kansas City, Kansas
Road bridges in Kansas
Interstate 35
Girder bridges in the United States
1970s establishments in Kansas
Bridges completed in the 20th century